Two of a Kind: Music from the Original Motion Picture Soundtrack is the soundtrack album of the film of the same name released in 1983 by MCA Records and features songs by the  film's star Olivia Newton-John, as well as songs from various other artists.

Although the film was a critical and commercial disappointment, the soundtrack was successful, especially in the United States, where it was certified Platinum by RIAA.

Overview
The soundtrack was produced by David Foster. The album contains songs recorded by Olivia Newton-John, John Travolta, Patti Austin, Steve Kipner, Boz Scaggs, the bands Journey and Chicago.

Newton-John and Travolta had previously worked together on the film Grease, which became a box office hit, the same success awaited the soundtrack and singles from it, including their duet "You're the One That I Want." This time around, they reteamed for another duet, "Take a Chance", which was released as a single in some territories, the very first single to credit Newton-John as a writer (she, in fact, wrote the lyrics; the music was written by Foster and Toto's Steve Lukather). In the U.S. the song was a b-side and only serviced to radio. On the strength of the latter, it entered the top three of the Adult Contemporary chart,. In Canada, it hit #1 on the Adult Contemporary charts.

Newton-John's American top 5 hit "Twist of Fate" was nominated for Best Short Form Music Video at the 27th Annual Grammy Awards.
The song also hit #4 in both Canada and Australia and became a #1 single in Luxembourg. "(Livin' in) Desperate Times" was issued as the second single in the U.S. and reached number 31 in the Hot 100.

In support of the album, two additional single were issued. "Ask the Lonely" by Journey, which was originally intended for the album Frontiers (1983) hit #3 on Billboard's Mainstream Rock Chart. "It's Gonna Be Special" by Patti Austin, hit #82 on the Hot 100 and also entered the Hot Black Singles chart at number 15 and top 5 of the dance chart in 1984,.

Track listing

Charts

Certifications and sales

Twist of Fate video

Twist of Fate is a 1983 video collection of the music videos from the Two of a Kind soundtrack by Olivia Newton-John. The video was released on VHS and LaserDisc by MCA Home Video. All videos of standard release are directed by Brian Grant except for "Take a Chance", which was directed by David Mallet.

Track listing

References

Albums produced by David Foster
Olivia Newton-John soundtracks
1983 soundtrack albums
MCA Records soundtracks
Romance film soundtracks
Fantasy film soundtracks
Comedy film soundtracks